Maple Creek is a former provincial electoral district for the Legislative Assembly of the province of Saskatchewan, Canada, centered on the town of Maple Creek. This district was one of 25 created for the 1st Saskatchewan general election in 1905. It was dissolved and merged with part of the Shaunavon riding before the 23rd Saskatchewan general election in 1995 to form the constituency of Cypress Hills.

A federal electoral district in the same area existed from 1914 to 1953.

Members of the Legislative Assembly

Election results

|-
 
|style="width: 130px"|Provincial Rights
|David James Wylie
|align="right"|555
|align="right"|55.78%
|align="right"|–

|- bgcolor="white"
!align="left" colspan=3|Total
!align="right"|995
!align="right"|100.00%
!align="right"|

|-
 
|style="width: 130px"|Provincial Rights
|David James Wylie
|align="right"|613
|align="right"|66.78%
|align="right"|+11.00

|- bgcolor="white"
!align="left" colspan=3|Total
!align="right"|918
!align="right"|100.00%
!align="right"|

|-
 
|style="width: 130px"|Conservative
|David James Wylie
|align="right"|669
|align="right"|57.62%
|align="right"|-9.16

|- bgcolor="white"
!align="left" colspan=3|Total
!align="right"|1,161
!align="right"|100.00%
!align="right"|

|-

 
|Conservative
|David James Wylie
|align="right"|1,944
|align="right"|46.59%
|align="right"|-11.03
|- bgcolor="white"
!align="left" colspan=3|Total
!align="right"|4,173
!align="right"|100.00%
!align="right"|

|-

|Independent
|David Stuart Horne
|align="right"|1,279
|align="right"|40.11%
|align="right"|–
|- bgcolor="white"
!align="left" colspan=3|Total
!align="right"|3,189
!align="right"|100.00%
!align="right"|

|-

|- bgcolor="white"
!align="left" colspan=3|Total
!align="right"|Acclamation
!align="right"|

|-

|- bgcolor="white"
!align="left" colspan=3|Total
!align="right"|1,978
!align="right"|100.00%
!align="right"|

|-

 
|Independent
|David Stuart Horne
|align="right"|1,859
|align="right"|46.91%
|align="right"|-
|- bgcolor="white"
!align="left" colspan=3|Total
!align="right"|3,963
!align="right"|100.00%
!align="right"|

|-

 
|Conservative
|James McDougald
|align="right"|1,784
|align="right"|29.55%
|align="right"|-

|Farmer-Labour
|Jacob James Hubening
|align="right"|1,140
|align="right"|18.88%
|align="right"|–
|- bgcolor="white"
!align="left" colspan=3|Total
!align="right"|6,038
!align="right"|100.00%
!align="right"|

|-

|- bgcolor="white"
!align="left" colspan=3|Total
!align="right"|7,756
!align="right"|100.00%

|-
 
|style="width: 130px"|CCF
|Beatrice Trew
|align="right"|3,656
|align="right"|49.15%
|align="right"|-

 
|Prog. Conservative
|George C. Stewart
|align="right"|911
|align="right"|12.24%
|align="right"|-
|- bgcolor="white"
!align="left" colspan=3|Total
!align="right"|7,439
!align="right"|100.00%
!align="right"|

|-

 
|CCF
|Beatrice Trew
|align="right"|2,590
|align="right"|32.37%
|align="right"|-16.78

|- bgcolor="white"
!align="left" colspan=3|Total
!align="right"|8,001
!align="right"|100.00%
!align="right"|

|-

 
|CCF
|Walter Melrose
|align="right"|3,291
|align="right"|47.27%
|align="right"|+14.90
|- bgcolor="white"
!align="left" colspan=3|Total
!align="right"|6,962
!align="right"|100.00%
!align="right"|

|-

 
|CCF
|Les G. Benjamin
|align="right"|2,511
|align="right"|33.16%
|align="right"|-14.11

|- bgcolor="white"
!align="left" colspan=3|Total
!align="right"|7,572
!align="right"|100.00%
!align="right"|

|-

 
|CCF
|Les G. Benjamin
|align="right"|2,360
|align="right"|33.02%
|align="right"|-0.14

 
|Progressive Conservative
|Marlyn K. Clary
|align="right"|700
|align="right"|9.80%
|align="right"|-
|- bgcolor="white"
!align="left" colspan=3|Total
!align="right"|7,146
!align="right"|100.00%
!align="right"|

|-

 
|CCF
|William P. Rolick
|align="right"|2,424
|align="right"|35.70%
|align="right"|+2.68
 
|Progressive Conservative
|Marlyn K. Clary
|align="right"|1,389
|align="right"|20.46%
|align="right"|+10.66
|- bgcolor="white"
!align="left" colspan=3|Total
!align="right"|6,790
!align="right"|100.00%
!align="right"|

|-

 
|NDP
|Ernie Howes
|align="right"|1,901
|align="right"|34.32%
|align="right"|-1.38
 
|Progressive Conservative
|Marlyn K. Clary
|align="right"|955
|align="right"|17.24%
|align="right"|-3.22
|- bgcolor="white"
!align="left" colspan=3|Total
!align="right"|5,539
!align="right"|100.00%
!align="right"|

|-
 
|style="width: 130px"|NDP
|Gene Flasch
|align="right"|2,858
|align="right"|47.84%
|align="right"|+13.52

 
|Progressive Conservative
|Marlyn K. Clary
|align="right"|704
|align="right"|11.78%
|align="right"|-5.46
|- bgcolor="white"
!align="left" colspan=3|Total
!align="right"|5,974
!align="right"|100.00%
!align="right"|

|-

 
|Progressive Conservative
|Eric Richardson
|align="right"|2,241
|align="right"|31.25%
|align="right"|+19.47
 
|NDP
|Gene Flasch
|align="right"|2,232
|align="right"|31.13%
|align="right"|-16.71
|- bgcolor="white"
!align="left" colspan=3|Total
!align="right"|7,171
!align="right"|100.00%
!align="right"|

|-
 
|style="width: 130px"|Progressive Conservative
|Joan Duncan
|align="right"|3,496
|align="right"|48.80%
|align="right"|+17.55
 
|NDP
|Norman Arndt
|align="right"|2,327
|align="right"|32.48%
|align="right"|+1.35

|- bgcolor="white"
!align="left" colspan=3|Total
!align="right"|7,164
!align="right"|100.00%
!align="right"|

|-
 
|style="width: 130px"|Progressive Conservative
|Joan Duncan
|align="right"|4,228
|align="right"|55.53%
|align="right"|+6.73
 
|NDP
|J.R. Porter
|align="right"|2,158
|align="right"|28.34%
|align="right"|-4.14

|- bgcolor="white"
!align="left" colspan=3|Total
!align="right"|7,614
!align="right"|100.00%
!align="right"|

|-
 
|style="width: 130px"|Progressive Conservative
|Joan Duncan
|align="right"|4,199
|align="right"|60.87%
|align="right"|+5.34
 
|NDP
|Barry Elderkin
|align="right"|2,185
|align="right"|31.68%
|align="right"|+3.34

|- bgcolor="white"
!align="left" colspan=3|Total
!align="right"|6,898
!align="right"|100.00%
!align="right"|

|-
 
|style="width: 130px"|Prog. Conservative
|Jack Goohsen
|align="right"|2,627
|align="right"|40.55%
|align="right"|-20.32
 
|NDP
|Bryan Oster
|align="right"|1,987
|align="right"|30.67%
|align="right"|-1.01

|- bgcolor="white"
!align="left" colspan=3|Total
!align="right"|6,479
!align="right"|100.00%
!align="right"|

See also 
Maple Creek – Northwest Territories territorial electoral district (1870–1905).

Electoral district (Canada)
List of Saskatchewan provincial electoral districts
List of Saskatchewan general elections
List of political parties in Saskatchewan
Maple Creek, Saskatchewan

References 
 Saskatchewan Archives Board – Saskatchewan Election Results By Electoral Division

Former provincial electoral districts of Saskatchewan